These are ranked lists of the provinces of Madagascar. Population figures are from 2001.

By population

By area

By population density

Madagascar
Madagascar geography-related lists